The Dalhousie Gazette (more commonly referred to as the Gazette) is the main student publication at Dalhousie University in Halifax, Nova Scotia, Canada. The paper first began publishing in 1868, making it the oldest continually operating student newspaper in North America followed by The Harvard Crimson (1873) and The Columbia Daily Spectator (1877). (The Brunswickan, printed out of the University of New Brunswick, actually predates The Gazette by a year, but began printing in magazine format). The founding editors were J.J. Cameron (who went on to found the Queen's Journal), A.P.Seeton, and W.E. Roscoe.

The Gazettes weekly circulation is 2,000, making it Halifax's third-largest free print publication. The Gazette is run, financed and published by the Dalhousie Gazette Publishing Society, a group of students made up from the Gazettes editors and contributors. The society operates independently of the Dalhousie Student Union, though the paper does charge an annual student levy through the DSU (approx $5.00 per student each academic year) as a means of complementing its advertising income.

The Gazettes primary mandate is to scrutinize and report on the financial, social and administrative powers of the Dalhousie Student Union, its student societies, and the Dalhousie University administration. Within this mandate, the Gazette also covers events and news related to the Dalhousie community, student body and alumni.

As one of Halifax's major independent publications, the Gazettes Dalhousie-centric mandate has often been expanded to include issues outside of the university community proper. Recent publication years of the Gazette gave seen a large emphasis on international events, local artists and regional politics. Reflecting this independent disposition, the Gazettes layout has dispensed with front-page story copy, printing instead a full-cover graphic (usually a photograph) and large teasers with page numbers under the fold.

Along with their Dalhousie counterparts, University of King's College students have made significant contributions to the paper despite being outside of the Gazettes levy umbrella. Aside from providing the paper with many staff reporters and photographers, King's students and alumni have recently filled some of the Gazettes top editorial positions. The editors-in-chief for much of the last decade were King's alumni, and significant portions of the newspaper's editorial staff over the years have come from King's.

A typical issue of the Gazette in 2013/2014 was 24 11x10 pages, with approximately 800 words appearing per page. As of 2022, the Gazette has 10 paid positions: editor-in-chief, managing editor, news editor, opinions editor, arts & culture editor, sports editor, copyeditor, outreach and engagement officer, director of finance and operations, and director of marketing and growth.

Notable alumni
 Ernest Buckler, OC, novelist
 Rt.Hon. Joe Clark, 16th Prime Minister of Canada
 George Elliott Clarke, Canada's parliamentary poet laureate
 Jan Crull, Jr., attorney, investment banker, filmmaker and Native American rights advocate
 Darrell Dexter, Premier of Nova Scotia (2009–2013)
 Duncan Cameron Fraser, 8th Lieutenant Governor of Nova Scotia
 Joseph Howe, journalist, politician and Canadian statesman who contributed a few articles to the Dalhousie Gazette during the Hants County byelection of 1869 (he was already sixty-five years of age). It was also in 1869 that Howe joined the Canadian Cabinet only to resign his position in 1873 to become Lieutenant Governor of Nova Scotia (he died the same year)
 Kenneth Leslie, Canadian poet
 Robert McNeil, television reporter, e.g. "McNeil-Lehrer Report" (American PBS)
 Hugh MacLennan, CC, author, five-time Governor General's award winner
 Lucy Maude Montgomery, CBE. author of Anne of Green Gables
 James Macdonald Oxley, author, lawyer

Gazette editors-in-chief
 2022/23 David J. Shuman
 2021/22 Lane Harrison
 2020/21 Tarini Fernando
 2019/20 Rebecca Dingwell
 2018/19 Kaila Jefferd-Moore
 2017/18 Kaila Jefferd-Moore
 2016/17 Eleanor Davidson
 2015/16 Jesse Ward/Sabina Wex
 2014/15 Jesse Ward
 2013/14 Ian Froese
 2012/13 Katrina Pyne
 2011/12 Dylan Matthias
 2010/11 Joel Tichinoff
 2009/10 Josh Boyter
 2008/09 Julie Sobowale
 2007/08 John Packman
 2006/07 Rafal Andronowski
 2005/06 Christopher LaRoche
 2004/05 Quentin Casey
 2003/04 Malcolm Repo Kempt
 2002/03 Caitlin Kealey
 2001/02 Kip Keen
 2000/01 Kip Keen
 1999/00 Natalie MacLellan
 1998/99 Natalie MacLellan
 1997/98 John Cullen
 1996/97 Shelley Robinson (Managing Editor)
 1995/96 Jennifer Horsey (Managing Editor) / Sam McCaig (Editor)
 1994/95 Judy Reid (Managing Editor) / Lilli Ju (Editor)
 1993/94 Ryan Stanley
 1992/93 Jenn Beck/Miriam Korn
 1991/92 Shannon Gowans/Chris Lambie/Marie-France Leblanc/Jerry West
 1990/91 Allison Johnston/Alex Burton
 1988/89 Sandy MacKay
 1974/75 Peter Clarke
 1973/74 Margaret Bezanson/Ken MacDougall
 1926/27 Andrew Olding Hebb
 1872/74 James Macdonald Oxley

(It was under the Bezanson/MacDougall editorship that the Gazette adopted the tabloid format with a front page graphic rather than a story or photograph. All of the front pages in 1973/74 were cartoons done by Ken Silver whose weekly creations reflected the major news event affecting Dalhousie that week.)

See also
 List of student newspapers in Canada
 List of newspapers in Canada

External links
 Official website

Gazette
Student newspapers published in Nova Scotia
Newspapers published in Halifax, Nova Scotia
Publications established in 1868
1868 establishments in Canada
Weekly newspapers published in Nova Scotia